Coenred or Cenred may refer to:
 King Coenred of Mercia
 King Coenred of Northumbria
 Coenred of Wessex, father of King Ine of Wessex
 MV Cenred, a vehicle and passenger ferry